Paradise is an extended play (EP) by British-American musician Anohni, released on 17 March 2017 by Secretly Canadian. The lead single, also titled "Paradise", was released on 26 January 2017. As with Anohni's previous album, Hopelessness, Paradise features collaborations with Hudson Mohawke and Oneohtrix Point Never.

The EP includes seven tracks, one of which called "I Never Stopped Loving You" has not been publicly released and was able to be acquired by sending Anohni, via her e-mail address, a personal e-mail sharing with her "...a sentence or two what you care most about, or your hopes for the future. Send this to me instead of the dollar you used to send me in the olden days."

Track listing

Notes
  signifies an additional producer

Personnel
Credits adapted from the liner notes of Paradise.

 Anohni – vocals, production , mixing 
 Hudson Mohawke – production , mixing 
 Oneohtrix Point Never – production 
 Paul Corley – additional production 
 Chris Elms – mixing 
 Valgeir Sigurðsson – mixing

Charts

References

External links
 

2017 EPs
Anohni albums
Albums produced by Hudson Mohawke
Albums produced by Daniel Lopatin
Secretly Canadian albums